3360 Syrinx (originally designated 1981 VA) is an Apollo and Mars crosser asteroid discovered in 1981. It approaches Earth to within 40 Gm three times in the 21st century: 33 Gm in 2039, 40 Gm in 2070, and 24 Gm in 2085.

On 2012-Sep-20 it passed  from the Earth at apparent magnitude 17.0. In opposition on 23 November 2012, it brightened to magnitude 16.0.

It is a member of the Alinda group of asteroids with a 3:1 resonance with Jupiter that has excited the eccentricity of the orbit over the eons. As an Alinda asteroid it makes approaches to Jupiter, Earth, and Venus.

For a time, it was the lowest numbered asteroid that had not been named. In November 2006, this distinction passed to 3708 Socus, and in May 2021 to (4596) 1981 QB.

See also 
 List of asteroids
 Syrinx

References

External links 
 
 
 

003360
003360
Discoveries by R. Scott Dunbar
Discoveries by Eleanor F. Helin
Named minor planets
19811104